First-seeded Maria Bueno defeated Carole Graebner 6–1, 6–0 in the final to win the women's singles tennis title at the 1964 U.S. National Championships.

Seeds
The seeded players are listed below. Maria Bueno is the champion; others show in brackets the round in which they were eliminated.

  Maria Bueno (champion)
  Margaret Smith (fourth round)
  Billie Jean Moffitt (quarterfinals)
  Lesley Turner (second round)
  Nancy Richey (semifinals)
  Ann Jones (quarterfinals)
  Robyn Ebbern (quarterfinals)
  Norma Baylon (fourth round)

Draw

Key
 Q = Qualifier
 WC = Wild card
 LL = Lucky loser
 r = Retired

Final eight

References

1964
1964 in women's tennis
1964 in American women's sports
Women's Singles